The Lifetime Achievement Award of the Africa Film Academy is given to individuals that have contributed tremendously to the growth of African cinema. Amaka Igwe was the first recipient of the award in 2005.

Awards

List of Winners

1st Africa Movie Academy Awards 
 Amaka Igwe

2nd Africa Movie Academy Awards 
 Hubert Ogunde (posthumously)
Gadala Gubara of the Sudan was in May 2006 awarded a lifetime achievement award at the second Africa Movie Academy Awards (AMAA) in Yenagoa,

3rd Africa Movie Academy Awards 
 Osita Iheme and Chinedu Ikedieze

9th Africa Movie Academy Awards 
 Chief Pete Edochie
 Tunde Kelani
 Sir Ositadinma Okeke Oguno (Ossy Affason)
 Ayuko Babu
 Eddie Ugbomah

10th Africa Movie Academy Awards 
 Bob-Manuel Udokwu

11th Africa Movie Academy Awards 
 Tony Vander Heyden

12th Africa Movie Academy Awards 
 Richard Mofe Damijo
 Olu Jacobs
 Joke Silva
 Tony Akposheri

References

Lists of award winners
Lifetime Achievement Award Africa Movie Academy Award winners